Édouard-Auguste Imer (23 December 1820, Avignon13 June 1881, Haarlem) was a French painter of Swiss ancestry. He travelled extensively, painting landscapes throughout Europe and North Africa.

Biography 
His father, Julien Auguste Imer (1787-1861), was a manufacturer and President of the Chamber of Commerce. He and Édouard's mother, Adèle Jeanrenaud (1790-1869), were originally from Neuchâtel. In 1846, he married Sophie Chaponnière (1822-1850), who died of a heart ailment; aged only twenty-seven. They had one daughter.

Until his wife's death, he was a partner in his father's business. Later, he studied in England and Germany and began exhibiting at the Salon and would be a regular contributor until 1876.

In 1849, he had made his first trip to Algeria, and became one of the first artists to paint there, rather than simply sketch. In 1853, he made an extended trip to Lazio with his friends, Ernest Hébert 
He spent the winter of 1855 in Egypt, with Jean-Léon Gérôme, Léon Belly and Frédéric Auguste Bartholdi, who was there at the invitation of the newly formed Suez Canal Company. He apparently made several visits to Venice during this time, but his earliest known work depicting that city was in 1872. Many of his Orientalist paintings from this period are unaccounted for.

He died while working on a commission in Haarlem. He was buried there and his grave is maintained in perpetuity by a grant from the Institut de France. In 1900, a promenade was named after him in Fréjus; one of his favorite places to paint.

Sources 
 Edouard Imer, exhibition catalogue, Association des Artistes, January 1882
 Lynne Thornton, Les Orientalistes, peintres voyageurs (1828-1908), Art Creation Realisation, 2001 
 Marion Vidal-Bué, Alger et ses peintres (1830-1960), Méditerranée, 2000

External links 

More works by Imer @ ArtNet

1820 births
1881 deaths
19th-century French painters
French landscape painters
French orientalists
Artists from Avignon